My Favorite Year is the debut solo album by American singer, guitarist and keyboardist Tony Scalzo of Fastball fame. Work on the album started on 2011, when Tony started a Kickstarter program. According to Tony, the songs he co-wrote with his Fastball colleague Miles Zuniga were originally created as Fastball tracks, but were not included in any of the band's records. He defined the genre of the album as "melodic pop".

Track listing

Personnel
 Tony Scalzo  - vocals, background vocals, acoustic guitar, bass, piano, guitar, Wurlitzer electric piano
 Stephen Belans - drums, percussion, production
 Jon Sanchez - additional guitars on all tracks except "Don't Let Anyone", "Halfway Girl", "Reality", "Par for the Course" and "Bed I Made"; Kaossilator on "Looks Like I've Thrown it All Away"
 Billy Cassis - additional guitars on  "Don't Let Anyone", "Reality", "Looks Like I've Thrown it All Away", "Forever Girl", and "Last Word"
 Darin Murphy - background vocals on "Love Lost", "Rreality", "Bed I Made", "Forever Girl", and "Last Word"
 Ian McLagan - Hammond B3 on "Forever Girl"
 Matt Hubbard - trombone and harmonium on "Free World"
 Steve Johnson - saxophone on "Free World"
 Andrew Noble, Luke Wollenzien and Annie Benavides - violins on "Halfway Girl"
 Dixie Yoder and Tom Strauch - violas on "Halfway Girl"
 Colin Ferguson and Rachel Horvitz - cellos on "Halfway Girl"

 Technical staff
 Joe Blaney - mixing
 Ryan Smith and Dave McNair - mastering
 Jeremy The Artist - portraits
 Matt Eskey - design

References

2013 debut albums